Jan Sebastian Rabie (14 November 1920 - 15 November 2001) was an Afrikaans writer of short stories, novels and other literary works. He was born in George, and was the writer of twenty-one works. He was included under the Sestigers, a group of influential Afrikaans writers of the 1960s.

Novels
Note: The English titles are translated from the Afrikaans, and are not available as such.

 Nog skyn die sterre (Still the stars are shining) (1943)
 Geen somer (No summer) (1944)
 Vertrou op môre (Believe in tomorrow) (1946)
 Die pad na mekaar (The road to one another) (1947)
 Dakkamer en agterplaas (Attic and backyard) (1957)
 Swart ster oor die Karoo (Black star over the Karoo) (1957)
 Ons, die afgod (Us, the idol) (1958)
 Die groen planeet (The green planet) (1961)
 Mens-alleen (Man alone) (1963)
 Die groot anders-maak (The great changing) (1964)
 Eiland voor Afrika (Island before Africa) (1964)
 Waar jy sterwe (Where you die) (1966)
 Klipwieg (Stone crib) (1970)
 Die hemelblom (The heavenly flower) (1971)
 Ark (Ark) (1977)
 Johanna se storie (Johanna's story) (1981)
 En oseaan (And Ocean) (1985)

Short stories
 Een-en-twintig (Twenty-one) (1956)
 Die roos aan die pels (The rose on the fur) (1966)
 Versamelverhale (Collected novels) (1980)

Non-fiction
 Groen reise (Green travels) (1950)
 Die evolusie van nasionalisme (The evolution of nationalism) (1960)
 Polemika, (Polemic) 1957-1965 (1966)
 ’n Haan vir Eloúnda (A rooster for Eloúnda) (1971)
 ’n Boek vir Onrus (A book for unrest) (1982)
 Buidel (Pouch) (1989)
 Paryse dagboek (Paris diary) (1998)

Young adult novels
 Twee strandlopers (Two beachwalkers) (1960)
 Seeboek van die sonderkossers (Sea book for those without food) (1975)

External links
 Stellenbosch writers

1920 births
2001 deaths
Sestigers
Afrikaans-language writers
South African male novelists
20th-century South African novelists
20th-century South African male writers